Khalid Albudoor is an Arabic poet born in Dubai in the United Arab Emirates. Albudoor, who was raised in Dubai, is considered to be one of the most important names in the modern poetry movement of the UAE.

Education and early work 

He studied mass communication at United Arab Emirates University and then attended Ohio University in the United States where he obtained an MA in script writing. He began publishing his poetry in 1980 and has been quite active in his community, helping to establish the Emirati Writers’ Union and participating in several poetry festivals in the UAE and abroad.  His first collection of poetry “NIGHT” , published in Lebanon in 1992, won Al-Khal Poetry Award. To date, he has published six poetry collections.

Since 1988, Albudoor has been working as researcher and documentary film writer focusing on the intangible cultural heritage of the United Arab Emirates. This includes oral heritage, Nabati poetry, traditional music, and storytelling.

He holds a master's degree in screenwriting from Ohio University in the United States. His documentaries and television programs have received awards and recognition, both locally and internationally.

Currently, he is a freelance researcher, writer, a life coach, and a cultural advisor at Hamdan Heritage Center in Dubai.

References

1961 births
Living people
People from Dubai
20th-century Emirati poets
United Arab Emirates University alumni
Ohio University alumni
21st-century Emirati poets